The Czech Green Party (SZ) held a leadership election on 9 September 2008. The incumbent leader Martin Bursík defeated challenger Dana Kuchtová.

Background
The Green Party entered the Czech parliament following the 2006 legislative election, and joined a coalition government with the Civic Democratic Party (ODS) and Christian and Democratic Union - Czechoslovak People's Party (KDU-ČSL). Conflicts within the party began in 2008 with Dana Kuchtová and Olga Zubová criticising Bursík. Bursík announced in July 2008 that a leadership election would be held in September 2008. Kuchtová announced that she would run against Bursík.

Voting
There were six candidates in total. 349 delegates voted, with Bursík receiving 226 votes and winning the election.

References

Green Party (Czech Republic) leadership elections
Green Party leadership election
Green Party (Czech Republic) leadership election
Indirect elections
Green Party (Czech Republic) leadership election